R-Tuned: Ultimate Street Racing is an arcade racing game developed by Sega AM2 And released by Sega on 23 October 2008 in Asia and North America, and on 17 April 2009 in Europe. The game focuses on the import scene and illegal street racing. The game runs on the Sega Lindbergh platform, and uses Virtua Fighter 5's characters model engine. Players can save their progress and records by using IC cards. There are boost buttons on the steering wheel, players can use unlimited boosts to speed up during the game.

There are 2 modes of the game :
Battle mode : players try to get highest points during the race
Time attack : players try to finish the course with the fastest time

Cities
 New York
 Hong Kong
 Shibuya
 Shinjuku

Cars
There are total 20 playable cars and 5 unplayable cars (Total: 25). The cars can be tuned up to higher levels for better performance. Also, comic graphic stickers and neon tubes can be added to the cars.

Playable cars:

 Chevrolet Corvette (C6)
 Ford Mustang
 Honda Integra
 Honda NSX
 Honda S2000
 Mazda RX-7 (FD)
 Mazda RX-8
 Mazda Savanna RX-7 (FC)
 Mitsubishi Eclipse
 Mitsubishi Lancer Evolution IX
 Nissan Fairlady Z (Z32)
 Nissan Fairlady Z (Z33) 
 Nissan Skyline GT-R (R32)
 Nissan Skyline GT-R (R34)
 Pontiac GTO
 Subaru Impreza
 Subaru Legacy
 Toyota Celica (T200)
 Toyota Celica (T230)
 Toyota Supra

Unplayable cars:

 Ford GT
 Dodge Viper
 1967 Ford Mustang
 Chevrolet Corvette (C3)
 Nissan GT-R

References

2008 video games
Arcade video games
Arcade-only video games
Sega arcade games
Racing video games
Street racing video games
Video games developed in Japan